Aladağ, formerly Karsantı, is a small city and a district in Adana Province, Turkey about 100 km north of the city of Adana, up in the mountains. This is an undeveloped area, the people live from agriculture and forestry. People from the Çukurova retreat up here in the summer to escape the heat on the plain, although it's too high up for a day trip.

The Aladağlar mountains are an eastern extension of the Taurus Mountains. These high mountains are a popular area for climbing, usually accessed from the north through the town of Niğde. The town of Aladağ sits on their southern side, accessed by road up from Adana. Approximately 9 kilometers from the settlement of Karsantı / Aladağ is Meydan Kalesi, an impressive castle and chapel constructed during the period of the Armenian Kingdom of Cilicia.  This fortresses has three baileys, an array of rounded towers, and a ceremonial hall whose decorations included carved capitals. The fortification was surveyed in 1974 and 1979.

References

External links
  District governor's official website
  District municipality's official website
 Miscellaneous images of Aladağ

 
Cities in Turkey
Populated places in Adana Province
Districts of Adana Province